Ganga Tera Pani Amrit (Ganga, Your Water Is Ambrosial) is a 1971 Bollywood drama film. The film stars Navin Nischol, Yogeeta Bali, Rehman, Pran, Nirupa Roy, Ashok Kumar and Shatrughan Sinha.

Cast
 Navin Nischol as Dinesh
 Yogeeta Bali as Manju
 Rehman as Devkinandan (Dinesh's Father)
 Pran as Birju / Brijmohan
 Nirupa Roy as Shobha
 Ashok Kumar as  Manju's Father
 Achala Sachdev as Manju's Mother
 Shatrughan Sinha as Lal Singh
 Narendra Nath as Chander
 Nana Palsikar as Masterji
 Jagdeep as Barber
 Ramesh Deo as Mahendra

Soundtrack

External links
 

1971 films
1970s Hindi-language films
1971 drama films
Films scored by Ravi
Indian drama films
Hindi-language drama films